Jarbidge is an unincorporated community in Elko County, Nevada, United States.

Jarbidge, along with the rest of Nevada except for the city of West Wendover, is legally in the Pacific Time Zone, but, along with other Idaho border towns such as Jackpot, Mountain City and Owyhee, unofficially observes the Mountain Time Zone due to closer proximity to and greater connections with towns in southern Idaho. Jarbridge is popular locally with hunters and campers with many campsites available in the area and high populations of Elk.

Access

Noted locally for its extreme remoteness, no paved roads exist within almost 20 miles of Jarbidge.  The community is usually and most easily accessed using a motor vehicle by way of Three Creek Road, which originates along U.S. Route 93 in Rogerson, Twin Falls County, Idaho; the final 18 miles of this route are unimproved, but usually, open all year. From Elko, the easiest access is by proceeding 55 miles north along Nevada State Route 225, then 27 miles east along Elko County Road 746, the North Fork-Charleston Road (signed for Charleston and Jarbidge), and finally 22 miles north along Elko County Road 748, the Charleston-Jarbidge Road. The latter two segments of this route are unimproved, at points, present serious road hazards, and receive no winter maintenance. They are often closed from as early as October or November to as late as June or July due to heavy snowfall.

History

"Jarbidge" is a name derived from the Shoshone language meaning "devil". Natives believed the nearby hills were haunted.

Gold was discovered near Jarbidge in 1909, making it the site of one of the last gold rushes in the Old West and, incidentally, was the site of the last stagecoach robbery in 1916. Its population swelled to near 2000 in 1911 but afterward began a slow decline when the mining facilities were largely cannibalized for the war effort during World War I. Mining operations ceased completely in 1932.  However, in 2013 permits for the removal of the gold were re-issued and the mine is reopening.

Jazz musician Ralph Peña was born in Jarbidge in 1927.

Climate

According to the Köppen Climate Classification system, Jarbidge has a warm-summer mediterranean continental climate, abbreviated "Dsb" on climate maps.

References

External links

Elko County website- Jarbridge Advisory Board

Populated places established in 1909
Unincorporated communities in Nevada
Unincorporated communities in Elko County, Nevada
Elko, Nevada micropolitan area
1909 establishments in Nevada